Simon Tozer (24 December 1933 – February 2003) was a British rower. He competed in the men's eight event at the 1956 Summer Olympics.

References

1933 births
2003 deaths
British male rowers
Olympic rowers of Great Britain
Rowers at the 1956 Summer Olympics
Rowers from Greater London